The Sphinx is an album by Sananda Maitreya (formerly Terence Trent D'Arby). It is available as MP3 files and on CD format, from his on-line web store. The record is the artist’s ninth studio album and the 16th project overall, including live albums releases.

Track listing
”The Sphinx” - 1:17
”Christine” - 4:08
”The Ballad of LeBron & Kobe” - 3:17
”I Saw Her” - 3:31
”If All I Do Is Cry” - 5:13
”The Blame” - 3:07
”The Captain's Table” - 3:29
”All The Way To Memphis” - 2:59
”Euphoria” - 4:15
”Azerbaijan” - 3:48
”Christine - Part 2” - 4:11
”King Of The Silver Medal” - 2:11
”This Far” - 3:25
”Sananda's Variation on a theme by Mozart” - 1:44
”Marry Me” - 3:52
”Big Baby” - 2:24
”What Baby Wants” - 3:37
”Eat My Thumb” - 2:44
”Time Takes Time” - Takes 2 - 2:39
”I Never Know” - 2:06
”The Laughing Song” - 3:58
”The Quarterback Song” - 2:14
”The Sphinx - Reprise” - 0:25
”She's Sad” - 2:44

References

External links
 

2013 albums
Terence Trent D'Arby albums